HEO may refer to:

 Heo, a Korean surname
 Heo (pronoun), an Old English pronoun
 Haelogo Airport in Papua New Guinea
 Heng On station, in Hong Kong
 High Earth orbit
 Higher Executive Officer, a grade within the United Kingdom's Civil Service
 Highly elliptical orbit
 Hockey Eastern Ontario
 KK HEO, a Bosnian basketball club